Danijela Martinović (born 15 July 1971), also known mononymously as Danijela, is a Croatian pop singer.

Biography
Born in Split to Croatian parents, Martinović began to sing from an early age. She has a sister, Izabela, who also pursued a music career through Split-based pop act Stijene. Her big breakthrough came in 1991 when she joined the pop band Magazin. Magazin had long been a big name on the Croatian music scene (as well as the wider area, dating back to Yugoslav times); as such, Martinović became one of the biggest national icons. They represented Croatia at the 1995 Eurovision Song Contest, along with the opera singer Lidija Horvat-Dunjko, they performed the song "Nostalgija" finishing 6th (out of 23 entries) with 91 points.

In 1996 she left Magazin to pursue a solo career, but she continued to work with the band's leader and prolific songwriter Tonči Huljić. That partnership resulted in Martinović winning the 1998 Dora contest with the ballad "Neka mi ne svane" ("May the Sun Never Rise") and becoming the Croatian representative at the 1998 Eurovision Song Contest, where she came in 5th (out of 25) with 131 pts.

In 2007, Martinović participated in the Croatian version of the television show Dancing with the Stars, in which she danced with Nicolas Quesnoit (who was winner of the first season with Zrinka Cvitešić). She was eliminated in the 5th episode.

In December 2010 she released a song called "Pola Pola". In 2011 she released the album Unikat. She presented the song "Brodolom" ("Shipwreck") at the Croatian music festival SPLIT 2012. It became the biggest summer hit in Croatia. The song reached more than 3 million views on YouTube in less than one month.

Discography

Albums
Zovem te ja (1996)
To malo ljubavi (1998)
I po svjetlu i po mraku (1999)
Pleši sa mnom (2001)
Božić s Danijelom (2003)
Oaza (2005)
Canta y baila con Danijela (2006)
Unikat (2011)

Singles

References

External links
Discography

1971 births
Living people
Musicians from Split, Croatia
Croatian pop singers
21st-century Croatian women singers
Eurovision Song Contest entrants for Croatia
Eurovision Song Contest entrants of 1995
Eurovision Song Contest entrants of 1998
20th-century Croatian women singers